This is a list of plants organized by their common names. However, the common names of plants often vary from region to region, which is why most plant encyclopedias refer to plants using their scientific names, in other words using binomials or "Latin" names.

A 

African sheepbush – Pentzia incana
Alder – Alnus
Black alder – Alnus glutinosa, Ilex verticillata
Common alder – Alnus glutinosa
False alder – Ilex verticillata  
Gray alder – Alnus incana
Speckled alder – Alnus incana
White alder – Alnus incana, Alnus rhombifolia, Ilex verticillata
Almond – Prunus dulcis
Aloe vera – Aloe vera
Amaranth – Amaranthus
Foxtail amaranth – Amaranthus caudatus
Ambrosia
Tall ambrosia – Ambrosia trifida
Amy root – Apocynum cannabinum
Angel trumpet – Brugmansia suaveolens
Apple – Malus domestica
Apricot – Prunus armeniaca
Arfaj – Rhanterium epapposum
Arizona sycamore – Platanus wrighitii
Arrowwood – Cornus florida
Indian arrowwood – Cornus florida
Ash – Fraxinus spp.
Black ash – Acer negundo, Fraxinus nigra
Blue ash – Fraxinus quadrangulata
Cane ash – Fraxinus americana
European ash – Fraxinus excelsior
Green ash – Fraxinus pennsylvanica lanceolata
Maple ash – Acer negundo
Red ash – Fraxinus pennsylvanica lanceolata
River ash – Fraxinus pennsylvanica
Swamp ash – Fraxinus pennsylvanica
White ash – Fraxinus americana
Water ash – Acer negundo, Fraxinus pennsylvanica
Azolla – Azolla
Carolina azolla – Azolla caroliniana

B

Bamboo – bamboosa ardinarifolia
Banana – mainly Musa × paradisica, but also other Musa species and hybrids
Baobab – Adansonia
Bay – Laurus spp. or Umbellularia spp.
Bay laurel – Laurus nobilis (culinary)
California bay – Umbellularia californica
Bean – Fabaceae, specifically Phaseolus spp. 
Bearberry – Ilex decidua
Bear corn – Veratrum viride
Beech – Fagus
Bindweed
Blue bindweed – Solanum dulcamara
Bird's nest – Daucus carota
Bird's nest plant – Daucus carota
Bird of paradise – Strelitzia reginae
Birch – Betula spp.
Black birch – Betula lenta, Betula nigra
Bolean birch – Betula papyrifera
Canoe birch – Betula papyrifera
Cherry birch – Betula lenta
European weeping birch – Betula pendula
European white birch – Betula pendula
Gray birch – Betula alleghaniensis
Mahogany birch – Betula lenta
Paper birch – Betula papyrifera
Red birch – Betula nigra
River birch – Betula nigra, Betula lenta
Silver birch – Betula papyrifera
Spice birch – Betula lenta
Sweet birch – Betula lenta
Water birch – Betula nigra
Weeping birch – Betula pendula
White birch – Betula papyrifera, Betula pendula
Yellow birch – Betula alleghaniensis
Bittercress – Barbarea vulgaris, Cardamine bulbosa, Cardamine hirsuta
Hairy bittercress – Cardamine hirsuta
Bittersweet – Solanum dulcamara
Trailing bittersweet – Solanum dulcamara
Bitterweed – Any plant in the genus Ambrosia, especially Ambrosia artemisiifolia, Artemisia trifida, Helenium amarum
Blackberry – Rubus spp., Rubus pensilvanicus, Rubus occidentalis
Hispid swamp blackberry – Rubus hispidus
Pennsylvania blackberry – Rubus pensilvanicus
Running swamp blackberry – Rubus hispidus
Black cap – Rubus occidentalis
Black-eyed Susan – Rudbeckia hirta, Rudbeckia fulgida
Blackhaw – Viburnum prunifolium
Blackiehead – Rudbeckia hirta
Black-weed – Ambrosia artemisiifolia
Blueberry – Vaccinium (Cyanococcus) spp.
Bluebell – Hyacinthoides non-scripta
Blue-of-the-heavens – Allium caeruleum
Bow-wood – Maclura pomifera
Box – Buxus
False box – Cornus florida
Boxelder – Acer negundo
Boxwood – Buxus, Cornus florida
False boxwood – Cornus florida
Brier
Sand brier – Solanum carolinense
Brittlebush – Encelia farinosa
Broadleaf – Plantago major
Brown Betty – Rudbeckia hirta
Brown-eyed susan – Rudbeckia hirta, Rudbeckia triloba
Buckeye (California buckeye) – Aesculus californica
Buckeye – Aesculus spp.
Buffalo weed – Ambrosia trifida
Bugle – Ajuga reptans
Butterfly flower – Asclepias syriaca
Butterfly weed – Asclepias tuberosa

C

Cabbage – Brassica oleracea
Clumpfoot cabbage – Symplocarpus foetidus
Meadow cabbage – Symplocarpus foetidus
Skunk cabbage – Symplocarpus foetidus, Lysichiton spp.
Swamp cabbage – Symplocarpus foetidus
California bay – Umbellularia californica
California buckeye – Aesculus californica
California sycamore – Platanus racemosa
California walnut – Juglans californica
Canada root – Asclepias tuberosa
Cancer jalap – Phytolacca americana
Carrot – Daucus carota
Wild carrot – Daucus carota
Carrot weed – Ambrosia artemisiifolia
Cart track plant – Plantago major
Catalina ironwood – Lyonothamnus floribundus ssp. floribundus
Cedar – Cedrus spp.
Blue Atlas cedar – Cedrus atlantica
Deodar cedar – Cedrus deodara
Chalk milkwort – Polygala calcarea
Charlock – Sinapis arvensis
Cherry – Prunus spp.
Black cherry – Prunus serotina
Cabinet cherry – Prunus serotina
Rum cherry – Prunus serotina
Whiskey cherry – Prunus serotina
Wild cherry – Prunus avium, Prunus serotina
Wild black cherry – Prunus serotina
Chestnut – Castanea spp.
Chigger flower – Asclepias tuberosa
Chrysanthemum – , Chrysanthemum morifolium
(True) cinnamon – Cinnamomum verum
Clove – Syzygium aromaticum
Clover – Trifolium spp.
Coakum – Phytolacca americana
Coconut – Cocos nucifera
Coffee plant – Coffea spp.
Colic weed – Corydalis flavula
Collard – Symplocarpus foetidus
Columbine – Aquilegia vulgaris
Colwort
Hare's colwort – Sonchus oleraceus
Comfrey – Symphytum spp.
Coneflower
Brilliant coneflower – Rudbeckia fulgida
Cutleaf coneflower – Rudbeckia laciniata
Eastern coneflower – Rudbeckia fulgida
Green-headed Coneflower – Rudbeckia laciniata
Orange coneflower – Rudbeckia fulgida
Tall coneflower – Rudbeckia laciniata
Thin-leaved Coneflower – Rudbeckia triloba
Three-leaved Coneflower – Rudbeckia triloba
Cornel
Blueberry cornel – Cornus amomum
Silky cornel – Cornus amomum
White cornel – Cornus florida
Cornelian tree – Cornus florida
Corydalis – Corydalis spp.
Fern-leaf Corydalis – Corydalis chelidoniifolia
Golden corydalis – Corydalis aurea
Pale corydalis – Corydalis flavula, Corydalis sempervirens
Pink corydalis – Corydalis sempervirens
Yellow corydalis – Corydalis lutea, Corydalis flavula
Cotton plant – Gossypium
Creeping yellowcress – Rorippa sylvestris
Cress – (several genera)
American cress – Barbarea verna
Bank cress – Barbarea verna
Belle Isle cress – Barbarea verna
Bermuda cress – Barbarea verna
Bulbous cress – Cardamine bulbosa
Lamb's cress – Cardamine hirsuta
Land cress – Barbarea verna, Cardamine hirsuta
Scurvy cress – Barbarea verna
Spring cress – Cardamine bulbosa
Upland cress – Barbarea verna
Crowfoot – Cardamine concatenata
Crow's nest – Daucus carota
Crow's toes – Cardamine concatenata
Cucumber – Cucumis sativus

D
 
Daisy
Brown daisy – Rudbeckia hirta
Common daisy, daisy – Bellis perennis
Gloriosa daisy – Rudbeckia hirta
Poorland daisy – Rudbeckia hirta
Yellow daisy – Rudbeckia hirta
Yellow ox-eye daisy – Rudbeckia hirta
Deadnettle – Lamium spp.
Henbit deadnettle – Lamium amplexicaule
Red deadnettle – Lamium purpureum
Spotted deadnettle – Lamium maculatum
Desert Rose – Adenium obesum 
Devil's bite – Veratrum viride
Devil's darning needle – Clematis virginiana
Devil's nose – Clematis virginiana
Devil's plague – Daucus carota
Dewberry
Bristly dewberry – Rubus hispidus
Swamp dewberry – Rubus hispidus
Dindle – Sonchus arvensis
Dogwood – Cornus spp.
American dogwood – Cornus florida
Florida dogwood – Cornus florida
Flowering dogwood – Cornus florida
Japanese flowering dogwood – Cornus kousa
Kousa dogwood – Cornus kousa
Drumstick – Moringa oleifera
Pacific dogwood – Cornus nuttallii
Silky dogwood – Cornus amomum
Swamp dogwood – Cornus amomum
Duck retten – Veratrum viride
Duscle – Solanum nigrum
Durian – Durio zibethinus
Durian kura kura – Durio testudinarius
Durian munjit – Durio grandiflorus
Durian pulu – Durio kutejensis
Red durian – Durio dulcis
Dye-leaves – Ilex glabra

E
 
Easter orchid – Cattleya schroederae  
Earth gall – Veratrum viride
Elderberry – Sambucus
Elegant lupine – Lupinus elegans 
Elephant apple – Dillenia indica
English bull's eye – Rudbeckia hirta
Eucalyptus – Eucalyptus spp.
Evergreen huckleberry – Vaccinium ovatum 
Extinguisher moss – Encalypta
Eytelia – Amphipappus

F

Fair-maid-of-France – Achillea ptarmica
Fairymoss Azolla caroliniana
Fellenwort – Solanum dulcamara
Felonwood – Solanum dulcamara
Felonwort – Solanum dulcamara
Fennel – Foeniculum vulgare
Ferns
Boston fern or sword fern – Nephrolepis exaltata
Christmas fern – Polystichum acrostichoides
Coast polypody – Polypodium scouleri
Kimberly queen fern  – Nephrolepis obliterata
Korean rock fern – Polystichum tsus-simense
Mosquito fern – Azolla caroliniana
Sword ferns – Polystichum spp.
Water fern – Azolla caroliniana
Western sword fern – Polystichum munitum
Feverbush – Ilex verticillata
Feverfew – Tanacetum parthenium
Field forget-me-not – Myosotis arvensis
Fig – Ficus spp.
Common fig – Ficus carica
Flax
 European flax – Linum usitatissimum
 New Zealand flax – Phormium tenax, Phormium colensoi
Fluxroot – Asclepias tuberosa
Foxglove – Digitalis purpurea
Fumewort
Yellow fumewort – Corydalis flavula

G

Gallberry – Ilex glabra
Garget – Phytolacca americana
Garlic
Golden garlic – Allium moly
Wild garlic – Allium canadense
Garlic mustard – Alliaria petiolata
Garlic root – Alliaria petiolata
Germander speedwell – Veronica chamaedrys
Gilliflower
Dame's gilliflower – Hesperis matronalis
Night scented gilliflower – Hesperis matronalis
Queen's gilliflower – Hesperis matronalis
Rogue's gilliflower – Hesperis matronalis
Winter gilliflower – Hesperis matronalis
Golden buttons – Tanacetum vulgare
Golden chain – Laburnum
Goldenglow – Rudbeckia laciniata
Golden Jerusalem – Rudbeckia hirta
Gordaldo – Achillea millefolium
Goose tongue – Achillea ptarmica
Grapefruit – Citrus × paradisi
Grapevine – Vitis
Grass - Poaceae
Moody Grass - Poa tristis
Green berry nightshade – Solanum opacum
Groundberry – Rubus hispidus
Bristly groundberry – Rubus hispidus
Gutweed – Sonchus arvensis

H

Haldi – Curcuma domestica
Harlequin
Rock harlequin – Corydalis sempervirens
Yellow harlequin – Corydalis flavula
Hay fever weed – Ambrosia artemisiifolia, Artemisia trifida
Healing blade – Plantago major
Hedge plant – Maclura pomifera
Hellebore – Helleborus
American white hellebore – Veratrum viride
Big hellebore – Veratrum viride
Black hellebore – Veratrum nigrum
European white hellebore – Veratrum album
False hellebore – Veratrum album, Veratrum viride
Swamp hellebore – Veratrum viride
White hellebore – Veratrum album, Veratrum viride
Hemp – Cannabis spp., specifically Cannabis sativa
Hemp dogbane – Apocynum cannabinum
Hen plant – Plantago major
Herb barbara – Barbarea vulgaris
Hogweed – Ambrosia artemisiifolia
Holly – Ilex spp.
Deciduous holly – Ilex decidua, Ilex verticillata
European holly – Ilex aquifolium
Inkberry holly – Ilex glabra
Meadow holly – Ilex decidua
Swamp holly – Ilex decidua
Winterberry holly – Ilex verticillata
Honesty – Lunaria annua
Horse cane – Ambrosia trifida
Hound's berry – Solanum nigrum
Huckleberry – Vaccinium spp.
Evergreen huckleberry – Vaccinium ovatum
Trailing red huckleberry – Vaccinium parvifolium
Houseleek – Sempervivum tectorum
Hydrangea – Hydrangea macrophylla

I

Indian hemp – various genera
Indian hemp – Apocynum cannabinum, Cannabis indica
White Indian hemp – Asclepias incarnata
Indian paintbrush – Castilleja, Castilleja mutis, Asclepias tuberosa
Indian posy – Asclepias tuberosa
Inkberry – Ilex glabra, Phytolacca americana
Ironwood – Acacia estrophiolata
Isle of Man cabbage – Coincya monensis
Itchweed – Veratrum viride
Ivy – Hedera spp.

J
 
Jack-by-the-hedge – Alliaria petiolata
Jack-in-the-bush – Alliaria petiolata
Jasmine – Jasminum officinale
Jewel orchid – Ludisia discolor
Jointed rush – Juncus kraussii
Jugflower – Adenanthos obovatus
Juneberry – Amelanchier canadensis
Juniper – Various species in the genus Juniperus

K

Keek – Rorippa sylvestris
King fern – Ptisana salicina
Kinnikinnik – Cornus amomum
Kittentail – Veronica bullii
Knotweed (Japanese) – Reynoutria japonica (syn. Fallopia japonica)
Kousa – Cornus kousa
Kudzu – Pueraria montana
Kumarahou – Pomaderris kumeraho

L
 
Laceflower – Daucus carota
Lace fern – Asparagus setaceus
Lady's mantle – Alchemilla mollis
Lady's smock – Cardamine pratensis
Lamb's foot – Plantago major
Latanier palm – Phoenicophorium
Laurel magnolia – Magnolia splendens
Lavender – Lavandula
Leek – Allium
Lemon – Citrus × limon
Leopard lily – Lilium catesbaei
Lily of the Nile – Agapanthus praecox
Lettuce – Lactuca sativa
Lily leek – Allium moly
Lilac
Summer lilac – Hesperis matronalis
Little sunflower – Helianthella
Lone fleabane – Erigeron cavernensis
Love-lies-bleeding – Amaranthus caudatus
Love vine – Clematis virginiana
Lupin – Lupinus

M

Magnolia – Magnolia
Bracken's Brown Beauty magnolia – Magnolia grandiflora
Galaxy magnolia – Magnolia x
Jane magnolia – Magnolia x
Kay Parris magnolia – Magnolia grandiflora
Little Gem magnolia – Magnolia grandiflora
Moonglow magnolia – Magnolia virginiana
Royal Star magnolia – Magnolia stellata
Serendipity Ruby magnolia – Magnolia figo
Southern magnolia – Magnolia grandiflora
Stellar Ruby magnolia – Magnolia figo
Sweetbay magnolia – Magnolia virginiana
Waterlilly Star magnolia – Magnolia stellata
Maize – Zea mays
Mango – Mangifera indica
Maple – Acer
Ash-leaved maple – Acer negundo
Black maple – Acer nigrum
Creek maple – Acer saccharinum
Cutleaf maple – Acer negundo
Maple ash – Acer negundo
Moose maple – Acer pensylvanicum
Red river maple – Acer negundo
River maple – Acer saccharinum
Silver maple – Acer saccharinum
Silverleaf maple – Acer saccharinum
Soft maple – Acer saccharinum
Striped maple – Acer pensylvanicum
Sugar maple –  Acer saccharum (main use), Acer barbatum, Acer leucoderme,
Swamp maple – Acer saccharinum
Water maple – Acer saccharinum
White maple – Acer saccharinum
Mesquite –  Prosopis
Honey mesquite – Prosopis glandulosa
Screwbean mesquite – Prosopis pubescens
Milfoil – Achillea millefolium
Milkweed – Asclepias, Sonchus oleraceus
Blunt-leaved Milkweed – Asclepias amplexicaulis
Common milkweed – Asclepias syriaca
Horsetail milkweed – Asclepias verticillata
Orange milkweed – Asclepias tuberosa
Swamp milkweed – Asclepias incarnata
Rose milkweed – Asclepias incarnata
Whorled milkweed – Asclepias verticillata
Yellow milkweed – Asclepias tuberosa
Milky tassel – Sonchus oleraceus
Moosewood – Acer pensylvanicum

Morel
Petty morel – Solanum nigrum
Morelle verte – Solanum opacum
Mosquito plant – Azolla caroliniana
Mother-of-the-evening – Hesperis matronalis
Mountain mahogany – Betula lenta
Mulberry – Morus
Red mulberry – Morus rubra
White mulberry – Morus alba

N

Native fuchsia – Epacris longiflora
Necklace fern – Asplenium flabellifolium
Neem – Azadirachta indica
Nettle – Urtica dioica
Bull nettle – Solanum carolinense
Carolina horse nettle – Solanum carolinense
Horse nettle – Solanum carolinense
Night-blooming cactus – Hylocereus
Nightshade
American nightshade – Phytolacca americana, Solanum americanum
Bitter nightshade – Solanum dulcamara
Black nightshade – Solanum nigrum, Solanum americanum
Climbing nightshade – Solanum dulcamara
Deadly nightshade – Atropa belladonna
Garden nightshade – Solanum nigrum
Trailing nightshade – Solanum dulcamara
Trailing violet nightshade – Solanum dulcamara
Woody nightshade – Solanum dulcamara
Nodding wakerobin – Trillium cernuum
Northern moonwort – Botrychium boreale
Nosebleed – Achillea millefolium

O

Oak tree – Quercus
Algerian Oak – Quercus canariensis
Blue oak – Quercus douglasii
Bur oak – Quercus macrocarpa
California Black Oak Quercus kelloggii
Canyon Live Oak Quercus chrysolepis
Champion oak – Quercus rubra
Coast live oak – Quercus agrifolia
Cork oak – Quercus suber
Dyer's oak – Quercus velutina
Eastern black oak – Quercus velutina
English oak – Quercus robur
Island oak – Quercus tomentella
Mirbeck's oak – Quercus canariensis
Mossycup white oak – Quercus macrocarpa
Northern red oak – Quercus rubra
Pedunculate oak – Quercus robur
Pin oak – Quercus palustris
Red oak – Quercus rubra, Quercus coccinea
Scarlet oak – Quercus coccinea
Scrub oak – Quercus macrocarpa
Sessile oak – Quercus petraea
Spanish oak – Quercus coccinea, Quercus rubra
Spotted oak – Quercus velutina
Swamp oak – Quercus palustris, Quercus bicolor
Swamp Spanish oak – Quercus palustris
Swamp white oak – Quercus bicolor
Valley oak – Quercus lobata
White oak – Quercus alba
Yellowbark oak – Quercus velutina
 Obedient Plant – Physostegia virginiana
Olive – Olea europaea
Onion – Allium
Common onion – Allium cepa
Giant onion – Allium giganteum
Nodding onion – Allium cernuum
Tree onion – Allium canadense
Wild onion – Allium canadense
Orange – 
Osage orange – Maclura pomifera
Sweet orange – Citrus × sinensis
Wild orange – Maclura pomifera
Orange-root – Asclepias tuberosa
Osage – Maclura pomifera
Osier – Salix; (in North America) Cornus
Red osier – Cornus amomum

P

Parsley – Petroselinum crispum
Parsnip – Pastinaca sativa, Daucus carota
Pea – Pisum sativum
Peach – Prunus persica
Peanut – Arachis hypogaea
Pear – Pyrus
Pellitory
Bastard pellitory – Achillea ptarmica
European pellitory – Achillea ptarmica
Wild pellitory – Achillea ptarmica
Penny hedge – Alliaria petiolata
Pepper root – Cardamine concatenata
Petty spurge – Euphorbia peplus
Pigeon berry – Phytolacca americana
Pine – Pinus
Loblolly Pine – Pinus taeda
Pineapple – Ananas comosus
Pistachio – Pistacia vera
Plane (European sycamore) – Platanus acerifolia
Plantain
Broadleaf plantain – Plantago major
Common plantain – Plantago major
Dooryard plantain – Plantago major
Greater plantain – Plantago major
Roundleaf plantain – Plantago major
Wayside plantain – Plantago major
Pleurisy root – Asclepias tuberosa
Poached egg plant – Limnanthes douglasii
Pocan bush – Phytolacca americana
Poison ivy – Toxicodendron radicans
Poisonberry – Solanum dulcamara
Poisonflower – Solanum dulcamara
Poke – Phytolacca americana
Indian poke – Veratrum viride
Pokeroot – Phytolacca americana
Pokeweed – Phytolacca americana
Polkweed – Symplocarpus foetidus
Polecat weed – Symplocarpus foetidus
Poor Annie – Veratrum viride
Poor man's mustard – Alliaria petiolata
Poplar – Populus
Poppy – Papaveraceae
Possumhaw – Ilex decidua
Potato – Solanum tuberosum
Primrose – Primula vulgaris

Q
Queen Anne's lace – Daucus carota, Anthriscus sylvestris
Quercitron – Quercus velutina

R

Radical weed – Solanum carolinense
Ragweed – Ambrosia
Common ragweed – Ambrosia artemisiifolia
Giant ragweed – Ambrosia trifida
Great ragweed – Ambrosia trifida
Ragwort – Senecio
Common ragwort – Senecio jacobaea
Hoary ragwort – Senecio erucifolius
Marsh ragwort – Senecio aquaticus
Oxford ragwort – Senecio squalidus
Silver ragwort – Senecio cineraria
Rantipole – Daucus carota
Rapeseed – Brassica napus
Raspberry – Rubus (Idaeobatus) spp.
Black raspberry – Rubus occidentalis
Purple raspberry – Rubus occidentalis
Redbrush – Cornus amomum
Redbud – Cercis spp.
Eastern redbud – Cercis canadensis
Western redbud – Cercis occidentalis
Judas-tree – Cercis siliquastrum
Red ink plant – Phytolacca americana
Redweed – Phytolacca americana
Rheumatism root – Apocynum cannabinum
Rhubarb – Rheum rhabarbarum
Ribwort – Plantago major
Rice
Asian rice – Oryza sativa
African rice – Oryza glaberrima
Roadweed – Plantago major
Rocket – (several genera)
Dame's rocket – Hesperis matronalis
Sweet rocket – Hesperis matronalis
Winter rocket – Barbarea vulgaris
Yellow rocket – Barbarea vulgaris
Rocketcress – Barbarea vulgaris
Rose – Rosa
Baby rose – Rosa multiflora
Dwarf wild rose – Rosa virginiana
Low rose – Rosa virginiana
Multiflora rose – Rosa multiflora
Prairie rose – Rosa virginiana
Rambler rose – Rosa multiflora
Wild rose – Rosa virginiana
Rosemary – Rosmarinus officinalis
Rye – Secale cereale

S

Saffron crocus – Crocus sativus
Sanguinary – Achillea millefolium
Saskatoon – Amelanchier alnifolia
Sauce-alone – Alliaria petiolata
Scarlet berry – Solanum dulcamara
Scoke – Phytolacca americana
Scotch cap – Rubus occidentalis
Scrambled eggs – Corydalis aurea
Scurvy grass – Barbarea verna
Serviceberry – Amelanchier
Common serviceberry – Amelanchier arborea
Downy serviceberry – Amelanchier arborea
Shadblow serviceberry – Amelanchier canadensis
Shadblow – Amelanchier canadensis
Shadbush – Amelanchier canadensis
Shrubby mayweed – Oncosiphon suffruticosum
Silkweed – Asclepias syriaca
Swamp silkweed – Asclepias incarnata
Virginia silkweed – Asclepias syriaca
Skunkweed – Symplocarpus foetidus
Snakeberry – Solanum dulcamara
Snowdrop – Galanthus
Sorrel – Oxalis
Redwood sorrel – Oxalis oregana
Speedwell
Corn speedwell – Veronica arvensis
Wall speedwell – Veronica arvensis
Spikenard – Nardostachys jatamansi
Spoolwood – Betula papyrifera
Squaw bush – Cornus amomum
Stammerwort – Ambrosia artemisiifolia
Star-of-Persia – Allium cristophii
Stickweed – Ambrosia artemisiifolia
Strawberry – Fragaria × ananassa
Strawberry tree – Arbutus unedo
Strawberry tree 'Marina' – Madrone – Arbutus 'Marina'
Sugarcane – Saccharum
Swallow-wort
Orange swallow-wort – Asclepias tuberosa
Silky swallow-wort – Asclepias syriaca
Sneezeweed – Achillea ptarmica
Sneezewort – Achillea ptarmica
Sunflower – Helianthus annuus
Sugarplum – Amelanchier canadensis
Soldier's woundwort – Achillea millefolium
Stag bush – Viburnum prunifolium
Swallow-wort
Orange swallow-wort – Asclepias tuberosa
Silky swallow-wort – Asclepias syriaca
Sweet potato – Ipomoea batatas
Sweet potato vine – Ipomoea batatas
Swinies – Sonchus oleraceus
Sycamore – Platanus spp.
Sycamore (California) – Platanus racemosa
Sycamore (Arizona) – Platanus wrighitii
Sycamore (American) – Platanus occidentalis
Sundari (Bangladesh) – Heritiera fomes
Gewa (Bangladesh) – Excoecaria agallocha

T

Tansy
Common tansy – Tanacetum vulgare
White tansy – Achillea ptarmica
Wild tansy – Ambrosia artemisiifolia
Tea – Camellia sinensis
Appalachian tea – Ilex glabra
Thimbleberry – Rubus occidentalis
Thimbleweed – Rudbeckia laciniata
Thousand-leaf – Achillea millefolium
Thousand-seal – Achillea millefolium
Tassel weed – Ambrosia artemisiifolia
Thistle – (Several genera)
Annual sow thistle – Sonchus oleraceus
California thistle – Cirsium arvense
Canada thistle – Cirsium arvense
Corn thistle – Cirsium arvense
Corn sow thistle – Sonchus arvensis
Creeping thistle – Cirsium arvense
Cursed thistle – Cirsium arvense
Field sow thistle – Sonchus arvensis
Green thistle – Cirsium arvense
Hard thistle – Cirsium arvense
Hare's thistle – Sonchus oleraceus
Milk thistle – Sonchus oleraceus
Nodding thistle – Carduus nutans L.
Perennial thistle – Cirsium arvense
Prickly thistle – Cirsium arvense
Sharp-fringed sow Thistle – Sonchus asper
Small-flowered Thistle – Cirsium arvense
Spiny sow thistle – Sonchus asper
Spiny-leaved sow Thistle – Sonchus asper
Swine thistle – Sonchus arvensis
Tree sow thistle – Sonchus arvensis
Way thistle – Cirsium arvense
Thyme – Thymus, specifically Thymus vulgaris
Tickleweed – Veratrum viride
Tobacco plant – Nicotiana
Tomato – Solanum lycopersicum
Toothwort – Cardamine concatenata
Cutleaf toothwort – Cardamine concatenata
Purple-flowered Toothwort – Cardamine concatenata
Touch-me-not – Impatiens capensis, Impatiens pallida, Mimosa pudica, Cardamine hirsuta
Traveller's joy – Clematis virginiana
Tread-softly – Solanum carolinense
Tree tobacco – Nicotiana glauca
Trillium – Trillium spp.
Western trillium – Trillium ovatum
Western wake robin – Trillium ovatum
White trillium – Trillium grandiflorum
Tuber-root – Asclepias tuberosa
Tulip – Tulipa
Tulsi – Ocimum santalum

U
Umbrella palm – Hedyscepe canterburyana
Umbrella papyrus – Cyperus alternifolius

V

Vanilla orchid – Vanilla
Varnish tree – Koelreuteria paniculata
Velvet bean – Mucuna pruriens
Viburnum – Viburnum
Blackhaw viburnum – Viburnum prunifolium
Leatherleaf viburnum – Viburnum rhytidophyllum
Violet – (several genera)
Viola species
African violet – Streptocarpus sect. Saintpaulia species
Damask violet – Hesperis matronalis
Dame's violet – Hesperis matronalis
Dog's-tooth-violet or dogtooth violet – Erythronium dens-canis
Violet bloom – Solanum dulcamara
Viper's grass – Scorzonera hispanica 
Virgin's bower – Clematis virginiana
Virginia virgin's bower – Clematis virginiana
Voodoo lily – Dracunculus vulgaris

W

Walnut – Juglans sp.
Wattle – Acacia
Mount Connor wattle – Acacia ammobia
Waybread – Plantago major
Weed (Marijuana) — Cannabis Sativa, Cannabis Indica, Cannabis Ruderalis
Western redbud – Cercis occidentalis
Wheat – Triticum spp.
White man's foot – Plantago major
White-root – Asclepias tuberosa
Wild cotton – Apocynum cannabinum,  Asclepias syriaca
Wild honeysuckle – Lambertia
Prickly honeysuckle – Lambertia echinata
Heath-leaved honeysuckle – Lambertia ericifolia
Fairall's honeysuckle – Lambertia fairallii
Mountain devil – Lambertia formosa
Honey flower – Lambertia formosa
Holly-leaved honeysuckle – Lambertia ilicifolia
Chittick – Lambertia inermis
Many-flowered honeysuckle – Lambertia multiflora
Round-leaf honeysuckle – Lambertia orbifolia
Green honeysuckle – Lambertia rariflora
Wild hops – Clematis virginiana
Willow – Salix
Coyote willow – Salix exigua
Goodding willow – Salix gooddingii
Red willow – Cornus amomum
Rose willow – Cornus amomum
Windroot – Asclepias tuberosa
Wineberry – Rubus phoenicolasius
Winterberry – Ilex verticillata
American winterberry – Ilex verticillata
Evergreen winterberry – Ilex glabra
Virginia winterberry – Ilex verticillata
Wintercress – Barbarea vulgaris
Early wintercress – Barbarea verna
Woodbine – Clematis virginiana
Woolly morning glory – Argyreia nervosa
Wormwood
Roman wormwood – Ambrosia artemisiifolia, Corydalis sempervirens
Wound rocket – Barbarea vulgaris

X

Y

Yarrow – Achillea
Common yarrow – Achillea millefolium
Fernleaf yarrow – Achillea filipendulina
Sneezewort yarrow – Achillea ptarmica
Woolly yarrow – Achillea tomentosa
Yellow fieldcress – Rorippa sylvestris
Yellowwood – Cladrastis lutea, Maclura pomifera
Yellow coneflower – Echinacea paradoxa
Yam – Dioscorea; (in North America) Ipomoea batatas
Yunnan camellia – Camellia yunnanensis

Z

Zebrawood – Brachystegia spiciformis
Zedoary – Curcuma zedoaria

See also
Lists of plants

References

Historical Common Names of Great Plains Plants
USDA PLANTS Database

+
Common name
+